Elymnias cottonis is a butterfly in the family Nymphalidae. It was described by William Chapman Hewitson in 1874. It is endemic to the Andaman islands in the Indomalayan realm.

Subspecies
E. c. cottonis
E. c. jennifferae Suzuki, 2006 (Little Andaman Island, Butler Bay)

References

External links
"Elymnias Hübner, 1818" at Markku Savela's Lepidoptera and Some Other Life Forms

Elymnias
Butterflies described in 1874
Butterflies of Indonesia
Taxa named by William Chapman Hewitson